Rotunda is a commune in Edineţ district, Moldova. It is composed of two villages, Hlinaia Mică and Rotunda.

References

Communes of Edineț District